RFA Regent (A486) was an ammunition, explosives and stores supply ship in the 'Royal Fleet Auxiliary'. She was built by Harland and Wolff, commissioned in 1967 and took part in the Falklands War.

Service
She helped evacuate British nationals from Cyprus during the Turkish invasion 1974.

After taking on stores at Glen Douglas and Plymouth, RFA Regent sailed from Plymouth on 19 April 1982 for Operation Corporate arriving in the Total Exclusion Zone(TEZ) on 8 May. She was one of the last to return home arriving back on 15 September 1982. She was also deployed for the first Gulf War in 1991.

Regent was decommissioned in October 1992. She sailed from Devonport on 21 January 1993 under the name Shahzadelal, for the delivery run to the Indian breakers. She arrived at Alang for scrapping on 19 February 1993.

References

Stores ships of the Royal Fleet Auxiliary
Ships of the Royal Fleet Auxiliary
Falklands War naval ships of the United Kingdom
1966 ships
Gulf War ships of the United Kingdom
Ships built by Harland and Wolff